Perinad railway station (Code:PRND) is an 'NSG 6 category' railway station, situated near the city of Kollam in Kollam district of Kerala. Perinad railway station is falls under the Thiruvananthapuram railway division of the Southern Railway zone, Indian Railways. Perinad railway station is situated between Munrothuruthu and Kollam Junction railway station. The nearest important major rail head is Kollam Junction railway station.

Perinad is well connected with various cities in India like Kollam, Trivandrum, Kochi, Thrissur, Kottayam through Indian Railways. It is one of the closest railway stations to Kollam Technopark and Institute of Fashion Technology Kerala (IFT-K).

Services
Passenger trains having halt at Perinad railway station.

See also
 Kollam Junction railway station
 Paravur railway station
 Sasthamkotta railway station
 Karunagappalli railway station

References

Perinad
Thiruvananthapuram railway division
Railway stations opened in 1958
1958 establishments in Kerala